Anton Mervar (1885 – 21 July 1942) was a manufacturer of Slovenian button accordions.
Anton began working with his father Anton Sr. in his father's shop in their hometown of Trifail, in the Austrian province of Krain (now Trbovlje, Slovenia). His father had learned on his own to repair Slovenian diatonic accordions, and eventually began to produce them himself in his workshop.

After a stint serving in the Austro-Hungarian army, Anton Jr. went to work as an apprentice in the accordion factory of Franc Lubas.
He completed his apprenticeship at the Lubas firm in Slovenia (then Austria) in 1912, after which he moved with his wife Francka and young son Tony to the United States, settling in Cleveland, Ohio  In 1915, he began making accordions in his home workshop. In 1921 he opened his own factory on St. Clair Avenue in Cleveland. Every second year he traveled to Europe to get parts for his accordions.

Mervar and his wife Francka died in a car accident on 21 July 1942. Shortly thereafter, their son Tony died from hypoglycemia, and Mervar's daughter Justine Mervar Reber, who inherited the factory, sold most of the unfinished accordion parts and machinery to Grossman Music. Justine continued to operate a record store, Mervar Music, out of her father's old factory with her husband Hans Reber until the late 1980s.

Mervar's accordions set a standard for accordion craftsmanship. His instruments are highly prized by accordionists and collectors for their excellence and distinctive, powerful tone.

References

External links
 Anton Mervar in the National Cleveland-Style Polka Hall of Fame
 The Music of Their Lives

1885 births
1942 deaths
Road incident deaths in Ohio
Slovenian emigrants to the United States
Austro-Hungarian emigrants to the United States